The 2011 Formula 3 Brazil Open was the second Formula 3 Brazil Open race held at Autódromo José Carlos Pace from January 20–23, 2011.

After perfect weekend of competition, the Brazilian Lucas Foresti of the Cesário Fórmula was crowned champion ahead of Yann Cunha competing for the Bassan Motorsport, Foresti team-mate Victor Guerin finished in third place. In Class B the Brazilian Raphael Abbatte was the winner.

Drivers and teams
 All cars are powered by Berta engines, and will run on Pirelli tyres. All teams were Brazilian-registered.

Classification

Qualifying

Race 1

Race 2

Pre-final Grid

Pre-final Race

Final Race

See also
Formula Three Sudamericana
Formula Three

References

External links
Official website of the Formula 3 Brazil Open

Formula 3 Brazil Open
Formula 3 Brazil Open
Brazil
Brazil F3
Formula 3 Brazil Open